The Taiwanese semiconductor industry, including IC manufacturing, design, and packing, forms a major part of Taiwan's IT industry. Due to its strong capabilities in OEM wafer manufacturing and a complete industry supply chain, Taiwan has been able to distinguish itself from its competitors and dominate the global marketplace. Taiwan’s semiconductor sector accounted for US$115 billion, around 20 percent of the global semiconductor industry. In sectors such as foundry operations, Taiwanese companies account for 50 percent of the world market, with Taiwan Semiconductor Manufacturing Company (TSMC) the biggest player in the foundry market.

Overview

TSMC and United Microelectronics Corporation (UMC) are the two largest contract chipmakers in the world, while MediaTek is the fourth-largest fabless semiconductor company globally. ASE Group is also the world's largest Outsourced Semiconductor Assembly and Test (OSAT) provider.

History
The Taiwanese semiconductor industry got its start in 1974. In 1976 the government convinced RCA to transfer semiconductor technology to Taiwan.

In 1987, TSMC pioneered the fabless foundry model, reshaping the global semiconductor industry. From ITRI's first 3-inch wafer fabrication plant built in 1977 and the founding of UMC in 1980, the industry had developed into a world leader with 40 fabs in operation by 2002. In 2007, the semiconductor industry overtook that of the United States, second only to Japan.

The sector output reached US$39 billion in 2009, ranking first in global market share in IC manufacturing, packaging, and testing, and second in IC design. Although the global financial crisis from 2007 to 2010 affected sales and exports, the industry has rebounded with companies posting record profits for 2010. In 2010 Taiwan had the largest share of 300 nm, 90 nm, and 60 nm manufacturing capacities worldwide, and was expected to pass Japan in total IC fab capacity by mid-2011. By 2020 Taiwan was the unmatched leader of the global semiconductor industry with Taiwan Semiconductor Manufacturing Company (TSMC) alone accounting for more than 50% of the global market.

Sustainability 
The semiconductor industry uses a large portion of the power produced in Taiwan. By 2022 TSMC alone is estimated to consume 7.2% of Taiwan's total power output. Due to pressure from customers and government regulations the semiconductor industry has been switching to green power. In July 2020 TSMC signed a 20-year deal with Ørsted to buy the entire production of two offshore wind farms under development off Taiwan's west coast. At the time of its signing it was the largest corporate green energy order ever made. Much of the switch to renewable energy has been mandated by Apple Inc. whose primary components suppliers are located on Taiwan.

Cybersecurity
The Taiwanese semiconductor industry is one of the top targets of Chinese intelligence activity abroad.

Geopolitics
Taiwanese TSMC and South Korean rival Samsung have near total control of the leading edge of the semiconductor industry with TSMC significantly ahead of Samsung. This situation in which global production capabilities have been concentrated in just two countries leads to significant geopolitical challenges and contributes heavily to changes in global technopolitics.

Due to its significant position in both the American and Chinese tech industry supply chains Taiwan has become an issue in the China–United States trade war and the larger geopolitical conflict between the two powers. The US prohibited companies which use American equipment or IP from exporting products to prohibited companies in China. This forced Taiwanese semiconductor companies to stop doing business with major Chinese clients like Huawei.

In January 2021 the German government appealed to the Taiwanese government to help persuade Taiwanese semiconductor companies to ramp up production as a global semiconductor shortage was hampering the German economy's recovery from the COVID-19 pandemic. A lack of semiconductors had caused vehicle production lines to be idled leading German Economy Minister Peter Altmaier to personally reach out to Taiwan's economics affairs minister Wang Mei-hua in an attempt to get Taiwanese semiconductor companies to increase their manufacturing capacity. Similar requests had been made by the United States, the European Union, and Japan. The Taiwanese government and TSMC announced that as much as was possible priority would be given to automakers from Taiwan's close geopolitical allies.

In April 2021 the US Government blacklisted seven Chinese supercomputing companies due to alleged involvement in supplying equipment to the PLA, Chinese military–industrial complex, and WMD programs. In response Taiwanese chipmakers Alchip and TSMC suspended new orders from Chinese supercomputing company Tianjin Phytium Information Technology.

The geopolitical strength of the semiconductor industry is often referred to as Taiwan's "Silicon Shield." According to the New York Times, "Taiwan has relied on its dominance of the microchip industry for its defense," and that, "because its semiconductor industry is so important to Chinese manufacturing and the United States consumer economy, actions that threaten its foundries would be too risky." In 2022 Matthew Pottinger challenged the existence of a Silicon Shield arguing that China does not behave in ways which appear rational to audiences in democratic countries.

See also
 Semiconductor industry in India
Semiconductor industry in China

References

Semiconductor device fabrication
Semiconductor industry by country
Industry in Taiwan